Lewis Dymoke Grosvenor Tregonwell (1758–1832) was a captain in the Dorset Yeomanry and a historic figure in the early development of what is now Bournemouth.

Early life
Born 1758 in Anderson, Dorset, Tregonwell lived at Cranborne Lodge as the squire. His second wife was Henrietta Portman. When Henrietta’s second child Grosvenor Tregonwell died, having been accidentally given a double dose of medicine, Henrietta sank into a melancholia, which resulted in the Tregonwells holidaying at Mudeford, near Christchurch, Hampshire, to recuperate. During their holiday they visited ‘Bourne’ which they found so delightful that they bought land, in 1810, built a house and so precipitated the growth of Bournemouth.

More than 200 years earlier, Tregonwell’s direct ancestor, Henry Hastings, the eccentric Dorset sportsman (son of George Hastings, 4th Earl of Huntingdon), had briefly controlled the land that his great-great-great grandson bought, when he was lord of the manor of Christchurch from 1597 until 1601. Hastings’ youngest daughter Dorothy married Thomas Tregonwell.

Military career
By 1796 Tregonwell was Captain of the Dorset Rangers and led cliff top patrols of the Dorset Yeomanry in the area of Bourne Heath between 1796 and 1802 during the Napoleonic Wars. The eastern part of Dorset was under the command of Henry Bankes of Kingston Lacy; Bankes divided his area into several smaller parcels, and allocated officers to each area. Tregonwell was matched with the easternmost region, which took him up to the Liberty of Westover (now the site of Bournemouth). The rangers’ duty was to keep watch for smugglers, particularly along the cliff-tops, where Chines (wide fissures in the soft cliffs) allowed potentially easy access for smugglers and French invaders.

Tregonwell was also a Justice of the Peace and Deputy Lieutenant for the county of Dorset. After the Battle of Trafalgar the threat of invasion by the French lessened and so in 1810 he felt that he was able to retire from the service.

Later life

Summer Mansion 
In 1810 the Tregonwells decided to build a house near Bourne Heath to live in over the summer months, their main residence was Cranborne Lodge. Tregonwell was able to buy  of what is now Bournemouth town centre for just £179 11s (£179.55) from Sir George Ivison Tapps, the Lord of the Manor of Christchurch.

On 4 July 1810 Tregonwell and his wife took their friends, the Grove family, on a visit to Bourne Mouth.

They slept in the new house for the first time on 24 April 1812.

The house survives to this day as a wing of the Royal Exeter Hotel.

Portman Lodge 
Tregonwell built his butler Symes his own cottage, original known as Symes' Cottage, but later renamed Portman Lodge, after Henrietta's maiden name. This building was badly damaged in a fire in 1922 and later demolished in 1930.

Legacy 
In 1832 Tregonwell died at the age of 73 and was buried in Anderson, but in 1843 his widow had his remains transferred to a vault in St Peter's Churchyard at Bournemouth. For many years Tregonwell was revered as 'The Founder' (of Bournemouth) the Mayor of Bournemouth would attend an annual Founder's Service at Saint Peter's, during which he would lay a wreath on Tregonwell's tomb.

When Portman Lodge was demolished in 1930 suspicions were raised that Tregonwell, or Symes at the very least, were involved in some way with smuggling. The Symes clan of Cranborne, Verwood and Sixpenny Handley had long been involved in smuggling, and the butler never appeared to travel with Tregonwell, so it is possible that he looked after his master's smuggling activities while he was away.

There is documentary evidence, mostly in private diaries, for instance of the Earl of Malmesbury, that the gentry colluded in smuggling activities; Tregonwell's smuggling connections, however, remain entirely speculative. Underground rooms were often used as ice-houses, as the only available form of refrigeration; it is largely wishful thinking that links such structures with smuggling. When Bournemouth was mostly heathland, it was small gravelly hollows surrounded by gorse bushes which were most likely to be used as hiding places, as contraband made a swift journey inland.

References 

History of Bournemouth
Deputy Lieutenants of Dorset
Queen's Own Dorset Yeomanry officers
1758 births
1832 deaths